Jigme Namgyel Wangchuck (born 5 February 2016) is the first child and heir apparent of King Jigme Khesar Namgyel Wangchuck of Bhutan and his wife, Queen Jetsun Pema. He has been the Crown Prince of Bhutan since his birth in 2016. His name was announced on 16 April 2016. Prior to the announcement, he was known only as The Gyalsey, which means "prince". Before his birth, his paternal uncle Prince Jigyel Ugyen of Bhutan was the heir presumptive to the throne. In honor of his birth, 108,000 trees were planted by thousands of volunteers in Bhutan. In 2017, in honor of his first birthday, a new damselfly species was named after the crown prince, Megalestes gyalsey. He is expected to become the sixth Druk Gyalpo (King of Bhutan).

He has a younger brother, Prince Dasho Jigme Ugyen Wangchuck. He is the youngest Crown Prince in the world.

Titles and styles

 5 February 2016 – present: His Royal Highness Crown Prince Jigme Namgyel Wangchuck, Druk Gyalsey (Dragon Prince) of Bhutan.

References

See also 
 House of Wangchuck
 Line of succession to the Bhutanese throne
 List of current heirs apparent

2016 births
Living people
People from Thimphu
Royal children
Bhutanese monarchy
Wangchuck dynasty
Heirs apparent
Sons of kings